Gary Strydom (born 1960) is a South African-born American IFBB professional bodybuilder. He is notable as being the only person to win a Championship title under Vince McMahon's now defunct World Bodybuilding Federation. After the fall of the WBF, Strydom decided to take a long break from competing in the mid 1990s. Prior to the WBF, Strydom won four IFBB professional titles.

Gary Strydom is also known for his line of bodybuilding clothing called Crazee Wear. He started the brand in 1989 and it was known for its baggy colorful pants.

Stats
Height: 
Off Season Weight: 
Competition Weight: 
Upper Arm Size:  
Chest Size: 
Thigh Size: 
Waist Size: 
Calf Size: 
Neck Size:

Contest history
 1983 NPC Florida Championships, Junior - Heavyweight, 1st and Overall
 1984 NPC USA Championships, HeavyWeight, 1st
 1986 NPC Nationals, HeavyWeight, 1st and Overall
 1987 IFBB Night of Champions, Winner
 1988 Chicago Pro Invitational, 2nd
 1988 Mr. Olympia, 5th
 1989 Arnold Classic, 3rd
 1989 Grand Prix France, 1st
 1989 Grand Prix Germany, 2nd
 1989 Grand Prix Melbourne, 1st
 1989 Grand Prix Spain (2), 2nd
 1989 Grand Prix Spain, 2nd
 1989 Grand Prix Sweden, 1st
 1989 World Pro Championships, 2nd
 1990 Grand Prix England, 2nd
 1990 Grand Prix Finland, 3rd
1990 Grand Prix France, 2nd
1990 Grand Prix Germany, 4th
1990 Grand Prix Italy, 3rd
1990 Houston Pro Invitational, 2nd
1990 Ironman Pro Invitational, 4th
1991 Night of the Champions
1991 WBF Championships, 1st
1992 WBF Championships, 1st
1996 Night of Champions, 12th
2006 Colorado Pro Championships, 7th

See also
List of male professional bodybuilders
List of female professional bodybuilders

References

External links
Official Gary Strydom Website
Bodybuilders.com profile

American bodybuilders
Living people
Professional bodybuilders
Sportspeople from Durban
1960 births
Alumni of Maritzburg College